Coptotriche singularis is a moth of the family Tischeriidae. It was described by Stonis and Diškus in 2008. It is found in Belize.

References

Moths described in 2008
Tischeriidae